Events in the year 2003 in Kerala.

Incumbents 

Governors of Kerala – Sikander Bakht

Chief ministers of Kerala – A. K. Antony

Events 

 
 January 18 - The two day Global Investors Meet organized by Government of Kerala begins at Kochi. The event was inaugurated by Atal Bihari Vajpayee and A. K. Antony.
 February 19 - Muthanga firing incident
 May 2 – The second Marad massacre took place, killing nine.
 May 13 – The first heart transplantation surgery in Kerala conducted at Medical Trust Hospital, Kochi under the leadership of Dr. Jose Chacko Periappuram.
 July 14 – Kerala based News broadcasting TV channel Indiavision launched.
 December 29 - Chief minister of Kerala A. K. Antony opens the first reach of Goshree bridges between Ernakulam and Bolghatty Island.
 Kerala observed 123 Hartal in 2003. Thereby effectively reducing working days to 160.

Deaths 

 July 16 – K. P. A. C. Azeez, 68, actor.
 October 10 - Nawab Rajendran, 53, journalist and activist.

See also 

 History of Kerala
 2003 in India

References 

2000s in Kerala